The Polish Men's Volleyball Cup is an annual competition for volleyball clubs in Poland. It is overseen by 
the Polish Volleyball Federation and the Professional Volleyball League SA (since 2000). The tournament was established in 1932 and takes place every year (with a few exceptions, not held in: 1937–1949, 1955–1959, 1962–1969, 1980, 2020). 

ZAKSA Kędzierzyn-Koźle are the current title holders, having beaten Jastrzębski Węgiel in the 2023 final.

Winners

Total titles won

MVP by edition
 2008–09 – 
 2009–10 – 
 2010–11 – 
 2011–12 – 
 2012–13 – 
 2013–14 – 
 2014–15 – 
 2015–16 – 
 2016–17 – 
 2017–18 – 
 2018–19 – 
 2020–21 – 
 2021–22 – 
 2022–23 –

See also
 PlusLiga
 Polish Men's Volleyball SuperCup

References

External links
 PlusLiga official website 
 Polish Volleyball Federation website 

 

Volleyball competitions in Poland
1932 establishments in Poland